The 2016 Campeonato Internacional de Tênis de Campinas was a professional tennis tournament played on clay courts. It was the sixth edition of the tournament which was part of the 2016 ATP Challenger Tour. It took place in Campinas, Brazil between 3 and 9 October 2016.

Singles main-draw entrants

Seeds

 1 Rankings are as of September 26, 2016.

Other entrants
The following players received wildcards into the singles main draw:
  Felipe Meligeni Alves
  Fernando Yamacita
  Marcelo Zormann
  Orlando Luz

The following players received entry using a protected ranking:
  Fabiano de Paula

The following players received entry from the qualifying draw:
  Pedro Sakamoto
  Carlos Eduardo Severino
  João Pedro Sorgi
  Bruno Sant'Anna

Champions

Singles

  Facundo Bagnis def.  Carlos Berlocq, 5–7, 6–2, 3–0 RET.

Doubles

  Federico Coria /  Tomás Lipovšek Puches def.  Sergio Galdós /  Máximo González, 6–7(4–7), 6–4, [10–2].

References

Campeonato Internacional de Tenis de Campinas
2016 in Brazilian tennis